The Screen Award for Best Villain is chosen by a distinguished panel of judges from the Indian Bollywood film industry and the winners are announced in January. The award was further extended when they included a separate female category for performance in a villainous role. Though this was only given once in 1996. Frequent winners include Priyanka Chopra and Ronit Roy with 2 wins each.

Winners

See also
 Screen Awards
 Bollywood
 Cinema of India

References

Screen Awards